The 2019 Chicago mayoral election was held on February 26, 2019, to determine the next Mayor of the City of Chicago, Illinois. Since no candidate received a majority of votes, a runoff election was held on April 2, 2019, between the two candidates with the most votes, Lori Lightfoot and Toni Preckwinkle. Lightfoot defeated Preckwinkle in the runoff election to become mayor, and was sworn in as mayor on May 20, 2019.

The election was officially non-partisan, with its winner being elected to a four-year term. The elections were part of the 2019 Chicago elections, which included elections for City Council, City Clerk, and City Treasurer.

Incumbent Mayor Rahm Emanuel initially announced he would run for a third term but withdrew in September 2018. Emanuel was first elected in 2011 (winning in the first round with 55.19% of the vote) and re-elected in 2015 (receiving 55.7% of the vote in the runoff election).

The runoff was historic, as it assured Chicago would elect its first African-American female mayor, its second elected African-American Mayor, after Harold Washington, and its second female mayor, after Jane Byrne. Not only is Lightfoot the first African-American woman mayor in Chicago's history, but she is also the first openly LGBT person to lead Chicago. Lightfoot's election made Chicago the largest city won by an African American woman, as well as the largest by an openly LGBT person, in United States history.

Campaign

First round
Incumbent mayor Rahm Emanuel declared his intent to seek re-election on October 17, 2017. One month later, Troy LaRaviere became the first opponent to declare their intent to run against Emanuel.

Later, in 2018, more opponents would declare their intent to run against Emanuel, with Garry McCarthy and Willie Wilson doing so in March, Dorothy A. Brown Cook, Ja'Mal Green, and Neal Sáles-Griffin doing so in April, Lori Lightfoot, John Kozlar, and Paul Vallas doing so in May, Matthew Rooney doing so in June, and Amara Enyia and Jerry Joyce doing so in August. By the end of the Summer of 2018, a dozen individuals had declared their candidacies.

On September 4, 2018, Emanuel announced that he would no longer be seeking re-election. Emanuel's announcement shook up the race, with many new candidates declaring their candidacies for mayor in the weeks that followed.

In late November, much of the media coverage on the race showed Toni Preckwinkle and Susana Mendoza (both of whom had entered the race after Emanuel bowed out) to be considered its two frontrunners.

The race for mayor was upended by Alderman Ed Burke's corruption scandal. Mayoral candidates Toni Preckwinkle, Susana Mendoza, Gery Chico, and Bill Daley all had connections to the disgraced alderman, and the scandal encouraged an anti-corruption and anti-machine politics sentiment among voters.

A number of issues were debated by the candidates throughout the campaign. One of the major issues was pensions, as the city's annual pensions contribution had been projected to double between 2018 and 2023. Another issue was education, where sub-issues included school closings that had taken place under the Emanuel administration and the possibility of reforming the school-board selection method. Another issue was crime. Particularly in light of cases such as the murder of Laquan McDonald, issues regarding practices by the city's law enforcement were also discussed by candidates. Another issue was the use of tax increment financing by the city. Affordable housing was another issue debated. Ethics reforms were also debated. Taxes were another issue debated, with some candidates advocating for a commuter tax and some candidates advocating for a property tax freeze.

After ballot challenges were settled, a total of fourteen candidates were included on the ballot for the first round of the election. This is the most candidates that have ever been on the ballot in the history of Chicago mayoral elections.

The first round of the election was considered highly competitive to the end, with a number of candidates shown by polls to be viable contenders to potentially advance to the run
off. For example, a poll conducted February 11–13 by Mason-Dixon Polling & Research Inc. for the media outlets Telemundo/NBC 5 Chicago illustrated what the outlets described as a tight five-way race between (in alphabetical order) Chico, Daley, Lightfoot, Mendoza, and Preckwinkle. On February 24, The Wall Street Journal described the race's polling as showing six candidates with the possibility of making the runoff, with the five strongest contenders being described as (in alphabetical order) Chico, Daley, Lightfoot, Mendoza, and Preckwinkle. Also on February 24, Chicago magazine wrote that it considered six individuals to have a chance of making the runoff, with those individuals being (in alphabetical order) Chico, Daley, Lightfoot, Mendoza, Preckwinkle, and Wilson.

In the first round, Lori Lightfoot placed first and Toni Preckwinkle placed second, securing them both a spot in the runoff election.

Lightfoot's first-place finish in the first round was regarded to be an upset. She was seen as a long-shot when she first entered the race. In late-January, Lightfoot's support in publicly released polls had only ranged between 2% and 5%. Despite her low poll numbers in January, Lightfoot had persisted in her campaign, performing well in debates and running some ads on television. She won the endorsement of the Chicago Sun-Times. She also garnered new personal endorsements, including those of the Scott Waguespack, David Orr, and Robin Kelly, of whom the Chicago Sun-Times' Mark Brown would later write in exploring the contributing factors to Lightfoot's first-round victory, "none of them heavyweights but influential enough to point the way for progressive voters looking for some sign, any sign, of how to pick their way through the thicket of candidates." While Lightfoot rose to  the top of some polls near the end of the race, she had peaked in support so late in the race that none of the other candidates had been focused on running negative ads against her. Lightfoot also was seen as ultimately benefiting from the Burke corruption scandal, as she was running as a "political outsider" on an anti-corruption platform. Preckwinkle's allies had also, accidentally, provided Lightfoot with free media attention on two noteworthy occasions. The first incident occurred February 18, when one of Lightfoot's press conferences was crashed by Preckwinkle ally Robert Martwick, with whom Lightfoot got into a heated exchange. The second incident where Preckwinkle's camp generated free headlines for Lightfoot was when, days before the first round of the election, her campaign manager, Scott Cisek, published a Facebook post likening Lightfoot to a Nazi, leading to his firing by the Preckwinkle campaign.

In Chicago, ethnic/racial coalitions had often played a key role in elections. As such, many of the candidates were seen as targeting different groups with their campaigns. Hispanic candidates Gery Chico and Susana Mendoza were seen as vying for the Hispanic vote. Toni Preckwinkle and Willie Wilson were seen as targeting the black vote. Bill Daley was seen as targeting the white vote. Lightfoot was seen as breaking the rules of traditional Chicago politics by not basing her candidacy on seeking the support of particular ethnic/racial groups.

Runoff
Throughout the runoff, Lightfoot led Preckwinkle in polls.

For the runoff, Lightfoot received endorsements from seven of the twelve candidates that had been eliminated in the first round (Gery Chico, Jerry Joyce, John Kozlar, Susana Mendoza, Neal Sales-Griffin, Paul Vallas, and Willie Wilson). Preckwinkle, in contrast, received no endorsements from any candidates that had been eliminated in the first round.

In what was considered a "sweep" of the city's major publications, retaining her endorsement from the Chicago Sun-Times, for the runoff, Lightfoot also received the endorsements of the Chicago Tribune and Crain's Chicago Business (both of which had endorsed Bill Daley in the first round).

Both Lightfoot and Preckwinkle positioned themselves as self-declared, "progressives". In a November 2019 retrospective, however, Edward McClelland of Chicago magazine wrote, "Lightfoot didn’t run as a progressive. She ran as a reformer, the political outsider who promised to quash the Chicago Way, as exemplified by Alderman Ed Burke and all the mayoral candidates who took his money. (Lightfoot's opponent, Toni Preckwinkle, ran as a progressive, but not a reformer.)"

In the runoff, Preckwinkle highlighted her depth of government experience and sought to emphasize a contrast with Lightfoot's lack of experience in elected office. Lightfoot criticized Preckwinkle's connections with controversial figures such as Ed Burke and Joseph Berrios.

The two candidates differed on rent control, with Preckwinkle seeking the repeal of a state law prohibiting local governments from imposing rent control, while Lightfoot did not advocate for rent control in Chicago. The candidates differed on prospective term limits, with Preckwinkle opposing them, and Lightfoot advocating limiting both mayoral tenures and City Council committee chairmanships to two terms. Preckwinkle sought to create a ban on aldermen holding outside jobs, while Lightfoot differed, instead preferring to only ban them from holding outside jobs that pose conflicts of interest with official their duties. Preckwinkle wanted the power to draw ward maps to remain in the hands of the City Council, while Lightfoot wanted a non-partisan and independent process to be created for redistricting. Preckwinkle defended retaining the practice of "aldermanic prerogative", while Lightfoot sought to bring an end to the practice. The candidates also differed on whether they would retain incumbent Superintendent of the Chicago Police Department Eddie T. Johnson, with Preckwinkle having stating that she planned to immediately dismiss Johnson of his post, while Lightfoot stated that she planned to retain him at least through the summer of 2019.

Lightfoot ultimately won a landslide victory in the runoff.

Candidates
In order to be listed on the ballot, candidates were required to submit petitions between November 19 and 26.

Any certified candidate (those whose petitions had been certified by the Board of Elections) may have had their nomination papers challenged up until December 1. Those candidates with properly-filed challenges against their petitions would have their candidature subjected to hearings and procedures which would assess the validity of their petitions. If any candidate failed to file a statement of economic interests within five days of having their petition certified, then their certification would be revoked.

The deadline to file a notarized declaration of intent to be a write–in candidate was December 27, 2018. An exception to the December 27 deadline for write-in candidates to file their declaration of intent existed for circumstances in which a candidate lost their certification after the December 27 deadline due to the outcome of a challenge to their petitions (candidates in this circumstance were granted until February 19 to file a notarized declaration of intent to run as a write-in candidate).

Certified candidates (those whose petitions had been certified by the Board of Elections) were permitted to have their name removed from the ballot if they officially withdrew any time before December 20, 2018. Even if they informally withdrew by ceasing to campaign, all certified candidates that did not file to formally withdraw before the December 20 deadline would have their names listed on the ballot regardless of whether they were still active contenders. However, after December 20 candidates still may have filed to officially withdraw, an action which would have instructed the Board of Elections to deem all votes cast for the candidates as invalid when tallying votes.

Due to the time needed to complete process of reviewing nearly 200 challenges to candidate petitions in the mayoral race and other municipal elections, the start of the early voting period for the first round had been delayed to January 29 from its previously scheduled January 17 date.

The total of fourteen candidates on the February mayoral ballot is record-setting for Chicago mayoral elections.

Candidates who advanced to runoff

Candidates eliminated in the first round

Write-in candidates
A full list of eligible write-ins was made available to precincts on election day.
 Rebecca Ayers
 Catherine Brown D'Tycoon, activist
 Ja'Mal Green, executive director of the Majostee Allstars Community Center and Black Lives Matter activist
 Daniel Fein
 Ryan Friedman
 Stephen Hodge
 John P. Loftus
 Richard Benedict Mayers, perennial candidate and alleged white supremacist, write-in candidate for Chicago City Clerk, Treasurer, and alderman in 2019; congressional candidate in 2000, 2002, 2008, 2016, and 2018; 1998 State House candidate; 1993 Berwyn city clerk and city treasurer candidate
 Tamara McCullough AKA Tamar Manasseh
 Robert A. Palmer
 Ziff A. Sistrunk
 Eric "Kubi" James Stewart
 Romaine Ware 
 Roger L. Washington, police officer, educator at Malcolm X College, pastor, candidate for alderman in Chicago's 24th ward in 2015
 Gregory Young

Petitions rejected
The following candidates had been denied inclusion on the ballot following successful challenges to their petitions:
Conrien Hykes Clark, octogenarian elementary school volunteer
 Dorothy A. Brown Cook, Clerk of the Circuit Court of Cook County since 2000
 Catherine Brown D'Tycoon, activist subsequently ran as write-in
 Sandra L. Mallory, former local school council president, former Chicago Public Schools security officer, candidate for alderman in Chicago's 15th ward in 2003 and 2015
 Richard Mayers, perennial candidate and alleged white supremacist, congressional candidate in 2000, 2002, 2008, 2016, and 2018; 1998 State House candidate; 1993 Berwyn city clerk and city treasurer candidate subsequently ran as write-in
 Roger L. Washington, police officer, educator at Malcolm X College, pastor, candidate for alderman in Chicago's 24th ward in 2015 subsequently ran as write-in

Withdrew
The following individuals are previously declared candidates who had terminated their candidacies. Unless otherwise indicated, these individuals did not submit petitions:
 Rahm Emanuel, incumbent Mayor of Chicago
 Ja'Mal Green (had submitted petition), executive director of the Majostee Allstars Community Center and Black Lives Matter activist subsequently ran as write-in
 William J. Kelly, radio host and perennial candidate, candidate for mayor in 2015, gubernatorial candidate in 2018, candidate for state comptroller in 2010, congressional candidate in 1994
 Troy LaRaviere, president of the Chicago Principals and Administrators Association
Matthew Rooney
William "Dock" Walls, perennial candidate, candidate for mayor in 2007, 2011, 2015

Declined
The following are prospective and speculative candidates that declined to run:

 Chance the Rapper, rapper, singer-songwriter, record producer
 Richard Boykin, former member of the Cook County Board of Commissioners
 Anthony Beale, Alderman from the 9th ward
 Walter Burnett Jr., Alderman from the 27th ward
 Tom Dart, Cook County Sheriff
 Arne Duncan, former U.S. Secretary of Education and former CEO of Chicago Public Schools
 Bridget Gainer, member of the Cook County Board of Commissioners
 Chuy García, Congressman from Illinois's 4th congressional district, former member of the Cook County Board of Commissioners and candidate for mayor in 2015
 Luis Gutierrez, former Congressman from Illinois's 4th congressional district
 Valerie Jarrett, former director of the White House Office of Public Engagement and Intergovernmental Affairs
 Ra Joy, executive director of CHANGE Illinois and candidate for lieutenant governor in 2018
 Raymond Lopez, alderman of the 15th Ward
 Lisa Madigan, former Attorney General of Illinois
 Proco Joe Moreno, member of the Chicago City Council from the 1st ward
 David Orr, former Cook County Clerk, former mayor of Chicago 1987–1987;
 Ricardo Muñoz, member of the Chicago City Council from the 22nd ward
 Maria Pappas, Cook County Treasurer
 Ameya Pawar, member of the Chicago City Council, and candidate for governor in 2018
 Mike Quigley, Congressman from Illinois's 5th congressional district
 Pat Quinn, candidate for Illinois Attorney General in 2018, former Governor of Illinois, former Lieutenant Governor of Illinois and former Treasurer of Illinois
 Carlos Ramirez-Rosa, Alderman for the 35th Ward (running for re-election)
 Kwame Raoul, Attorney General of Illinois, former member of the Illinois Senate
 Larry Rogers Jr., commissioner of the Cook County Board Of Review
 Michael Sacks, chief executive officer of GCM Grosvenor
 Roderick Sawyer, member of the Chicago City Council and chair of the Chicago City Council Black Caucus
 Kurt Summers, City Treasurer of Chicago
Pat Tomasulo, sportscaster, comedian
 Tom Tunney, member of the Chicago City Council from the 44th ward
 Anna M. Valencia, Chicago City Clerk
 Scott Waguespack, member of the Chicago City Council and chairman of the council's Progressive Reform Caucus
 Jesse White, Secretary of State of Illinois and former state representative

Endorsements

First round

Runoff

Fundraising

First round

Runoff
Note that following totals include the amount raised in both rounds of the election

Polling

First round

Only showing polls by more-established polling sources: ALG Research, Change Research, David Binder Research, Global Strategy Group, Lake Research Partners, Mason Dixon, Ogden & Fry, RABA Research, Public Policy Polling, Tulchin Research, Victory Research, We Ask America

Runoff

Ward poll(s)
The following are runoff polls limited to voters in a single ward:

Hypothetical runoff polling

with Gery Chico and Susana Mendoza

Other polling
If Rahm Emanuel were running for re-election, would you vote for him?

Results

First round

Results by ward 

Seven candidates each had pluralities in at least one of the city's fifty wards.
Wilson had pluralities in thirteen wards (Wards 6, 7, 9, 16, 17, 18, 20, 21, 24, 28, 29, 34, 37)
Lightfoot had pluralities in eleven wards (Wards 1, 25, 32, 33, 35, 40, 44, 46, 47, 48, 49)
Daley had pluralities in eight wards (Wards 2, 11, 38, 39, 42, 43, 45, 50)
Mendoza had pluralities in seven wards (Wards 12, 14, 15, 22, 30, 31, 36)
Preckwinkle had pluralities in six wards (Wards 3, 4, 5, 8, 26, 27)
Joyce had pluralities in four wards (Wards 13, 19, 23, 41)
Chico had a plurality in a single ward (Ward 10)

Of the city's eighteen wards that are predominantly black, Wilson carried a plurality of the vote in thirteen (Wards 6, 7, 9, 16, 17, 18, 20, 21, 24, 28, 29, 34, and 37) with Preckwinkle carrying a plurality of the vote in the remaining five (Wards 3, 4, 5, 8, and 27). In the combined vote of the city's predominately black wards, Wilson placed first, Preckwinkle placed second, Lightfoot placed third, Daley placed fourth, and Enyia placed fifth.

Runoff

Results by ward
Lightfoot won all fifty of the city's wards. Additionally, Lightfoot won 2,049 of the city's 2,069 voting precincts (all but twenty), a victory for Lightfoot in more than 99.03% of precincts.

The only neighborhood to back Preckwinkle over Lightfoot was Preckwinkle's home neighborhood of Hyde Park. Preckwinkle's strongest support was in Hyde Park and its surrounding area, with Preckwinkle only managing to outperform Lightfoot in a single precinct that was located away from that part of the city.

Voter turnout

First round
Turnout in the first round of the election was 35.20%. The low turnout was attributed to poor youth turnout and a drop off in voter turnout from the 2018 midterms.

The 35.32% turnout was higher than that of the first round of the 2015 election, but was lower than that of the 2015 runoff. Turnout was lower than in the previous open race in 2011.

Turnout was reported to be lowest among the millennial age demographic, with a lower turnout among those under 35 than the previous lowest under-35 turnout in 2007.

Runoff
Runoff turnout was 32.89%.

Portrayal in media
The Steve James documentary series City So Real, which premiered at the 2020 Sundance Film Festival and was later televised on National Geographic on October 28, 2020, centers on the mayoral election.

Timeline

2017
June: The organization Take Charge Chicago (led by former Illinois Governor Pat Quinn) begins circulating petitions to place a referendum on the November 2018 ballot which, if approved by voters, would have prohibited Chicago mayors from serving more than two consecutive terms. If approved by voters, this would have prevented incumbent mayor Rahm Emanuel from being eligible for re-election
October 19: Rahm Emanuel declares his intention to seek re-election
November 17: Troy LaRiviere announces candidacy

2018
March
March 21: Garry McCarthy announces candidacy
March 29: Willie Wilson announces candidacy

April
April 19: Dorothy A. Brown Cook announces candidacy
April 20: Ja'Mal Green announces candidacy
April 22: Neal Sáles-Griffin announces candidacy

May
May 2: Paul Vallas announces candidacy
May 8: John Kozlar announces candidacy
May 10: Lori Lightfoot announces candidacy

August
August 6: Take Charge Chicago formally submits to the Chicago Board of Election its petition for a term-limits referendum question to be included on the November 2018 ballot
August 24: Trudy Leong announces candidacy
August 29: Amara Enyia and Jerry Joyce announce candidacies
August 31: Chicago Board of Elections rules that the term-limits referendum question petitioned by Take Charge Chicago had collected a sufficient number of valid signatures to preliminary qualify for inclusion on the November 2018 ballot

September
September 4: Rahm Emanuel withdraws
September 11: Antoine Members and Charles Minor announce candidacies
September 12: Chicago Board of Elections rules that the term-limits referendum question petitioned by Take Charge Chicago is ineligible for inclusion on the November 2018 ballot due to improper phrasing
September 17: William M. Daley announces candidacy
September 18: Gery Chico and William J. Kelly announce candidacies
September 20: Toni Preckwinkle announces candidacy
September 27: LaShawn Ford announces candidacy

November
November 13: Troy LaRiviere withdraws
November 14: Susana Mendoza announces candidacy
November 19: First day of petition filing
Catherine Brown D'Tycoon, Jerry Joyce, Toni Preckwinkle, and Paul Vallas file petitions
November 23: Conrien Hykes Clark files petition
November 26: Final day of petition filing
Dorothy A. Brown Cook, Gery Chico, William M. Daley, Amara Enyia, Robert Fioretti, La Shawn K. Ford, Ja'Mal Green, John Kozlar, Lori Lightfoot, Sandra L. Mallory, Richard Mayers, Garry McCarthy, Susana Mendoza, Neal Sáles-Griffin, Roger L. Washington submit petitions
William J. Kelly withdraws
November 27: William "Dock" Walls withdraws

December
December 3: Deadline for challenges to be filed
Chico, Enyia, Fioretti, Joyce, Kozlar, Mallory, Preckwinkle, Vallas, and Wilson were not challenged, and were therefore certified as candidates and granted ballot status
Challenges were filed against the petitions of Brown Cook, Brown D'Tycoon, Daley, Ford, Green, Hykes Clark, Lightfoot, Mayers, McCarthy, Mendoza, Sáles-Griffin, and Washington.
December 20: Daley and McCarthy are both officially granted ballot status
December 27: Deadline to declare intent to run as a write-in candidates
Mendoza is officially granted ballot status
The petitions of Hykes Clark, Mallory, and Mayers are rejected, effectively removing these candidates' names from the ballot
Ja'Mal Green files to withdraw his name from the ballot and instead run as a write-in
December 31: Ja'Mal Green withdraws

2019
January
January 2:
Lightfoot is officially granted ballot status
The petitions of Brown D'Tycoon and Washington are rejected, effectively removing their names from the ballot
January 12: Ford is officially granted ballot status
January 22:
Sáles-Griffin is officially granted ballot status
The petition of Brown Cook is rejected, effectively removing her name from the ballot
January 29: Early voting begins for first round of election
February
February 26: First round of election is held
March
March 15: Early voting begins for the runoff election
April
April 2: Runoff election is held

References

External links
Chicago Mayoral Debate hosted by NBC5 and Telemundo Chicago, March 7, 2019, C-SPAN

Chicago mayoral
Chicago
Chicago mayoral election
Chicago mayoral election
2019
Lori Lightfoot